Hull Dockers ARLFC is an amateur rugby league team from Kingston upon Hull, with teams ranging form U4 (diddy dockers) to open age playing in the National Conference League. They currently play their home matches at The Willows, Holderness Road and Eastmount playing fields, Longhill Their playing colours are more traditionally green and white hoops. With a rapid growth between 2012 and 2019 this has seen numbers reaching the 200 mark between youth ages and some members of the U18s team selected to the first team and also representing City of Hull Academy set up.

Honours
 BARLA National Cup
 Winners (1): 1991–92
 BARLA Yorkshire Cup
 Winners (1): 1991–92

External links
 Official Website
 National Conference League - Hull Dockers page

Sport in Kingston upon Hull
BARLA teams
Rugby clubs established in 1880
1880 establishments in England
Rugby league teams in the East Riding of Yorkshire
English rugby league teams